Acoziborole (SCYX-7158) is an antiprotozoal drug invented by Anacor Pharmaceuticals in 2009, and now under development by the Drugs for Neglected Diseases Initiative for the treatment of African trypanosomiasis (sleeping sickness).

It is a structurally novel drug described as a benzoxaborole derivative, and is a one-day, one-dose oral treatment. Phase I human clinical trials were completed successfully in 2015. A single arm phase II/III trial, with no control group, was conducted from 2016 to 2019 in the Democratic Republic of the Congo and Guinea involving 208 eligible patients with trypanosomiasis caused by Trypanosoma brucei gambiense. The results of the study, published in The Lancet on 29 November 2022, found the treatment regimen had a efficacy greater than 95%. Two follow-up studies, one comparing acoziborole to nifurtimox/eflornithine and a double-blind, randomized trial of the drug based on WHO recommendations with 1,200 total participants, are underway as of November 2022.

As the regimen is significantly easier to administer compared to existing treatment options, some commentators expressed hope that acoziborole could significantly slow down or even eliminate the transmission of African trypanosomiasis in humans.

See also 
 Tavaborole

References 

 
Trifluoromethyl compounds
Organoboron compounds
Fluoroarenes